Frederick George Hugh Clayton (5 January 1873 – 20 March 1946) was an English first-class cricketer. In a first-class career which spanned from 1893 to 1902, he appeared mostly for Oxford University, making nine first-class appearances.

Life and cricket career
Clayton was born at Newcastle upon Tyne in January 1873. He was educated at Harrow School, before attending University College, Oxford. While studying at Oxford, Clayton made his debut in first-class cricket for Oxford University against Somerset at Oxford in 1893. He played first-class cricket for Oxford University until 1896, making six appearances, in addition to playing one first-class match for the Gentlemen of England against Oxford University in 1895. He scored 151 runs in six matches for the university, with a high score of 66. With his right-arm medium pace bowling, he took 7 wickets with best figures of 3 for 144. He also played rackets for Oxford, playing alongside Harry Foster in 1895 when the pair defeated Cambridge. He did not succeed in getting a blue while at Oxford.

He later toured British India with the Oxford University Authentics cricket team, playing two first-class matches against Bombay and the Parsees at Bombay in November 1902. He scored 148 runs at an average of 49.33 during the tour, including making his highest first-class score of 68. He also bowled impressively on the tour, taking 10 wickets at 18.20 apiece, with best figures of 7 for 70 against Bombay. In addition to playing at first-class level, he also played minor counties cricket for Northumberland between 1896 and 1906, making 75 appearances in the Minor Counties Championship. He remained associated with Northumberland even after he stopped playing, serving at the club secretary from 1897 to 1923, treasurer from 1903 to 1945 and president from 1935 to 1945. He died at Warkworth in March 1946.

References

External links

1873 births
1946 deaths
Cricketers from Newcastle upon Tyne
People educated at Harrow School
Alumni of University College, Oxford
English cricketers
Oxford University cricketers
Gentlemen of England cricketers
Northumberland cricketers
Oxford University Authentics cricketers
English cricket administrators